Máximo and Bartola (also known as Maximo Valdez Nunez and Bartola Velasquez respectively) were the stage names of two Salvadoran siblings both with microcephaly and cognitive developmental disability who were exhibited in human zoos in the 19th century. Originally from near Usulután, El Salvador, the siblings were given by their mother to a merchant who promised he would take them to Grenada to be educated and exhibited. They then went through several guardians afterwards. They were eventually billed as "Aztec Children" and an elaborate story was constructed of how they were found in the temple of a lost Mesoamerican city by the name of Iximaya. They toured the U.S. and Europe, appearing before various regents and dignitaries.

Career
Maximo and Bartola were first exhibited in the late 1840s. In 1850, they were described as being "about ten years of age" and "about eight years of age" respectively, and under the care of a Mr. Knox. In Summer 1852, a custody dispute arose regarding the two of them in Philadelphia. A Grenadian man named Raymondo Selva claimed that he had been given charge of them by their parents under the condition he would provide them with an education in exchange for exhibiting them in Grenada. This occurred near the village of Jacotal in the San Miguel Department of El Salvador. Selva was placed in confinement in Grenada by authorities and custody was transferred to his brother-in-law Selazar. Selazar formed a partnership with an American named John S. Addison, and an interpreter named Pedro Salva. They were then taken to the United States. Selva by that time had been released and had claimed to have met with the parents of the children again. He promised to get the children back. A Mr. J.M. Morris disputed parts of Selva's story, and claimed to have been the rightful guardian. The dispute was settled in December 1852. Custody was granted to Morris, but he was also ordered to pay Raymondo Selva $13,000.

Early the next year, they toured Washington, D.C., and visited President Millard Fillmore at the White House. By July 1853, they were under the guardianship of a man named Anderson, and were taken to Europe to be exhibited before Queen Victoria. While in London, they were examined by biologist Richard Owen, who considered them to not be Aztecs. They were the product of the mixing of the Spanish and American Indian ancestry. This led to more interest in their actual origins. Another version appeared which claimed they were the children of a mulatto woman from La Puerty located near Usulután, El Salvador. Years before, their mother exchanged them for gold with a Raimond Selva of Nicaragua. It was also claimed they had another sibling with their same condition. Mr. Morris was later their guardian again and exhibited them throughout Europe.

By November 1860, Maximo and Bartola were being exhibited at Barnum's American Museum alongside Chang and Eng Bunker. On January 7, 1867, the two were married in London under the names Maximo Valdez Nunez and Bartola Velasquez. J.M. Morris was still their guardian. It was reported in late 1867 that the male of the pair of Aztec children had died in Charleston, South Carolina, on November 11, 1867, while on tour alongside Dan Castello's Circus and that he was buried in Magnolia Cemetery. Other sources have Maximo and Bartola touring as the Aztec children together until the late 1800s.

References

19th-century Salvadoran people
People from San Salvador
People with microcephaly
Sideshow performers
People from Usulután Department